Embassy of the Republic of Indonesia to the Holy See is the diplomatic mission of the Republic of Indonesia to the Holy See, the universal ecclesiastical jurisdiction over the Catholic Church and the sovereign city-state of Vatican City.  The embassy is located outside the Vatican City territory in the Italian capital of Rome. The mission is currently headed by Ambassador Laurentius Amrih Jinangkung which was sworn in by President Joko Widodo on 14 September 2020.

History 

Before Indonesia's independence, the Holy See sent an Apostolic Delegation to the Dutch East Indies in 1947. After Holy See recognized Indonesia's sovereignty in 16 March 1950, Indonesia established diplomatic relations with the Holy See on 25 May 1950. Indonesia's inaugural ambassador was Sukarjo Wiryopranoto whom took office from 1950 until 1952.

See also 
 List of Indonesian ambassadors
 List of diplomatic missions of Indonesia
 Indonesia–Holy See relations

Reference

External links 
 
 
 

Indonesia
Holy See
Holy See–Indonesia relations